The Telephone Museum is a STEM Style Teaching museum located at 1661 Massachusetts Ave in Lexington, Massachusetts, United States. It was founded in 2012.

References

External links

The Telephone Museum in the News - Media coverage about the museum

Museums established in 2012
Museums in Boston
Industry museums in Massachusetts
Telephone museums
Telecommunications museums in the United States